Georgios Vlastos (born 11 July 1964) is a Greek retired football striker and later manager.

References

1964 births
Living people
Super League Greece players
Ergotelis F.C. players
OFI Crete F.C. players
Greek football managers
Panegialios F.C. managers
Paniliakos F.C. managers
Kallithea F.C. managers
Association football forwards
Footballers from Heraklion
Greek footballers